UFL is an upcoming free-to-play association football video game developed and published by Strikerz Inc. It was initially set to be released on PlayStation 4, PlayStation 5, Xbox One, Xbox Series X and Series S in 2022, but on 30 August 2022, it was announced by Eugene Nashilov, CEO of Strikerz Inc., that the game's release date would be "moved to 2023". The developers describe their model as "fair-to-play" with "a skill-first approach and zero pay-to-win options". They also declare this being their "core principle" with Strikerz Inc. CEO stating that "players’ success should not depend on the number of in-game purchases or the value of donations they make".

Development 
UFL was first revealed with a teaser trailer on 25 August 2021 during Gamescom 2021. Strikerz Inc. have been developing the project since 2016. Built using the Unreal Engine 4, the game is set to be released on PC, PlayStation 4, PlayStation 5, Xbox One, Xbox Series X and Series S.

Licenses 
The game has partnered with FIFPro, a worldwide representative organisation for over 65,000 professional footballers, as well as InStat, a sports performance analysis company, who will provide up-to-date statistics for each player.West Ham United, Sporting CP, Shakhtar Donetsk, Borussia Mönchengladbach, Monaco, Besiktas, Celtic, and Rangers have been announced as some of the licensed clubs. On 27 January 2022, UFL released its gameplay trailer, which included ambassadors Oleksandr Zinchenko, Romelu Lukaku, Kevin De Bruyne, Roberto Firmino, and Cristiano Ronaldo.

References

External links
 

Upcoming video games scheduled for 2023
Association football video games
Free-to-play video games
PlayStation 4 games
PlayStation 5 games
Xbox One games
Xbox Series X and Series S games
Unreal Engine games
Video games developed in Belarus